Synhamitermes ceylonicus, is a species of termite of the genus Synhamitermes. It is native to Sri Lanka.

References

Termites
Insects described in 1913